Into the Fire, also known as The Legend of Wolf Lodge, is a 1988 thriller film about a man who takes a job at a mysterious road-side lodge. The film was directed by Graeme Campbell, and stars Susan Anspach, Art Hindle, and Olivia d'Abo.

Film locations include the historic Mackenzie Inn, Kirkfield On and Head Lake On.

Cast
 Susan Anspach as Rosalind Winfield
 Art Hindle as Dirk Winfield
 Olivia d'Abo as Liette
 Lee Montgomery as Wade Burnett
 Maureen McRae as Vivian
 Steve Pernie as Policeman
 John Dondertman as Jimmy
 Alice O'Neil as Liette's Mother
 Bill Norman as Liette's Father

External links
 

1988 films
1980s erotic thriller films
American erotic thriller films
English-language Canadian films
Canadian erotic thriller films
Films directed by Graeme Campbell (director)
1980s English-language films
1980s American films
1980s Canadian films